Pupa tessellata is a species of small sea snail, a marine gastropod mollusc in the family Acteonidae.

Distribution
This species occurs in the Indo-Pacific.

References

External links
 Sea Slugs of Hawaii info

Acteonidae
Gastropods of New Zealand
Gastropods described in 1842